Piano Sonata in D minor may refer to:

 Piano Sonata No. 17 (Beethoven)
 Piano Sonata No. 2 (Prokofiev)
 Piano Sonata No. 1 (Rachmaninoff)